The Union County Academy for Information Technology (UC-AIT) is a full-time four-year public high school located in Scotch Plains, in Union County, New Jersey, United States, on the Union County Vocational Technical Schools Campus. The school is part of the Union County Vocational Technical Schools (UCVTS), which serves students in all of Union County. AIT focuses on education in computer science and computer engineering with an emphasis on mathematics and science.

As of the 2021–22 school year, the school had an enrollment of 287 students and 15.3 classroom teachers (on an FTE basis), for a student–teacher ratio of 18.8:1. There were 14 students (4.9% of enrollment) eligible for free lunch and 3 (1.0% of students) eligible for reduced-cost lunch.

The school has been accredited by the Middle States Association of Colleges and Schools Commission on Elementary and Secondary Schools.

Recognition and rankings
In September 2013, the academy was one of 15 schools in New Jersey to be recognized by the United States Department of Education as part of the National Blue Ribbon Schools Program, which Education Secretary Arne Duncan described as schools that "represent examples of educational excellence".

In its 2016 report on "America's Best High Schools", The Daily Beast ranked the school 23rd in the nation among participating public high schools and 9th among schools in New Jersey.

Academic graduation requirements
In order to graduate from the Academy for Information Technology, a student is required to have taken:
Four years of English
Freshmen: English I - World Literature
Sophomore: English II - Early American Literature
Junior: English III - Modern American Literature
Senior: English IV: Choice of three courses (British Literature, AP English Language and Composition, or AP English Literature and Composition)
Four years of Mathematics. Mathematics courses depend on an individual's skill level, which is determined based on an initial assessment in the 8th grade year.  Students are placed into one of the following classes each year:
 Combined Algebra (Algebra 1 & 2)
 Geometry/Trigonometry
 Math Analysis (Pre-Calculus)
 Calculus
 AP Calculus I/AB
 AP Calculus II/BC
 Multivariable Calculus
 Linear Algebra
 Mathematical Statistics and Data Sciences
 Business Intelligence and Analytics (required senior year math course for Business Track students)
 Probability & Statistics
 AP Statistics
Four years of Science
Freshmen: Biology I, Scientific Inquiry and Analysis
Sophomore: Chemistry I
Junior: Physics I
Senior: Choice of: AP Biology, AP Chemistry, AP Physics C: Mechanics, AP Physics C: Electricity and Magnetism, Anatomy and Physiology, AP Psychology, Introduction to Chemical Engineering, Biochemistry, Agricultural Science, Introduction to Sustainability, Bioinformatics, etc. 
Four years of Fitness/Health
Freshman: Fitness I, Health I
Sophomore: Fitness II, Health II
Junior: Fitness III, Health III
Senior: Fitness IV, Health IV
Four years of Computer Science / Business (at junior year students decide to pursue a computer science track or business track)
Freshmen: Computer Applications in Business - MOS Certifications in Microsoft Word, PowerPoint, and Excel and IC3 Digital Literacy Certifications 
Sophomore: AP Computer Science Principles AND Principles of Business and Finance
Junior: 
Computer Science Track: AP Computer Science A 
Business Track:  AP Economics (Macro/Micro)
Senior: 
Computer Science Track: Database Development & Programming
Business Track: Global Financial Markets and Investments
Three years of Social Studies
Freshmen: World History
Sophomore: US History I
Junior: US History II
Three years of World Language. World Language courses depend on an individual's skill level, which is determined based on an initial assessment in the 8th-grade year.
 Spanish I - Spanish IV
 AP Spanish Language and Culture
 AP Spanish Literature and Culture
 Linguistics
One half-year of Financial Literacy
This requirement is integrated into Principles of Business and Finance during sophomore year. 
One quarter-year of Visual, Performing, and/or Practical Arts
This requirement is integrated into Health II education.

Student organizations
Student organizations at AIT and those shared across the district include:
Art Club
Chess Club
Class Council – 9,10,11,12
Coding Club
Dance Club
Drama Club
Debate and Speech Club
Drama Club
Educators Rising
National FFA Organization
Future Business Leaders of America (FBLA)
Health Occupation Students of America
Gay/Straight Alliance (GSA)
Intramural Athletics
Math League
MultiCultural Club
Music Club
National Honor Society (NHS)
Newspaper Club
Relay For Life (RFL)
Robotics Club
Science Olympiad
SkillsUSA
Spanish Club
Spanish Honor Society (SHS)
Student Ambassadors Committee
Student Government
Technology Student Association
Yearbook Club

Many student organizations are district-wide.

References

External links
Union County Academy for Information Technology Web site

Data for the Academy for Information Technology, National Center for Education Statistics

2002 establishments in New Jersey
Educational institutions established in 2002
Magnet schools in New Jersey
NCSSS schools
Information technology institutes
Public high schools in Union County, New Jersey
Scotch Plains, New Jersey